Telmatherina bonti is a species of fish in the subfamily Telmatherininae part of the family Melanotaeniidae, the rainbowfishes. It is endemic to Indonesia where it is found in Lake Towuti, near Malili and in Lake Mahalona all on Sulawesi.

References

bonti
Taxa named by Max Carl Wilhelm Weber
Taxa named by Lieven Ferdinand de Beaufort
Taxonomy articles created by Polbot
Fish described in 1922